Blackhurst is a surname. Notable people with the surname include:

Chris Blackhurst (born 1959), English journalist and newspaper editor
Klea Blackhurst, American actress
W. E. Blackhurst (1904–1970), American writer 

English-language surnames